Beechwood Park may refer to:

Places
Beechwood Park, Newport, a park in Newport, Wales
Beechwood Park, Nova Scotia, a suburb of Halifax, Nova Scotia, Canada
Beechwood Park (mansion), a building near Markyate, Hertfordshire, England, now housing Beechwood Park School
 RAF Beechwood Park, a Royal Air Force Satellite Landing Ground

Football grounds in Scotland
Beechwood Park, Auchinleck, home of Auchinleck Talbot F.C.
Beechwood Park, Dundee, home of Lochee Harp F.C. until 2017
Beechwood Park, Glasgow, home of Thistle F.C. 1884–1892, then Strathclyde F.C.
Beechwood Park, Leith, Edinburgh, home of Leith Athletic

Other uses
 "Beechwood Park", a song by the Zombies from the 1968 album Odessey and Oracle

See also

Beechwood (disambiguation)